Academy is an Australian television drama film made by the Australian Film & TV Academy and Catholic Radio & TV and produced with a low budget on the Gold Coast.

Cast
 Paula Duncan as Jennifer Haywood
 Tony Bonner as Jack Steele
 Michael McGlinchey as William
 Heath Williams as Tim
 Jessica Orcsik as Natalie Steele
 Asia Matthews as Lilly Zabriski
 Suellen Underwood as Geraldine
 Pauline Campton-Lowe as Doris
 Bryan Williams as David Stolz
 Matt Flanagan as Tom
 Azura Adams as Joanna Parsons

References

External links
 

Australian drama television films
1990s English-language films
1996 television films
1996 films
1996 drama films